Gobi Arts and Science College (Gobi Arts College)  is an autonomous institution affiliated to Bharathiar University located in Gobichettipalayam, Tamil Nadu, India. It was founded in 1968 by K. M. Ramaswamy Gounder.

History 
The college was established in 1968 affiliated to Madras University, Chennai. Later, the college became affiliated to Bharathiar University, Coimbatore. It is a co-educational grant-in-aid institution managed by the Gobi Arts College Council, registered on 25.8.1967 under the Societies Registration Act, XXI of 1860. The college was started with the noble objective of opening the doors of higher education to the poor and meritorious students who are mostly first generation students coming from agricultural families.

Courses 
 Eighteen undergraduate courses
 Sixteen postgraduate programmes
 M.Phil. and Ph.D. programmes

Vision
Social and Economic upliftment of the people of this area through value based quality education. Committed to serve the society with humility and trust, devoid of exploitation; to impart value based higher education, particularly to the socially and economically deprived sections of this area; to make the students of this institution worthy citizens of our glorious motherland.

See also 
 Gobichettipalayam
 Bharathiar University

References

Universities and colleges in Erode district
Education in Gobichettipalayam
Educational institutions established in 1968
1968 establishments in Madras State
Colleges affiliated to Bharathiar University